Robbin Kieft (born 22 July 1987) is a Dutch former professional footballer who played for Eredivisie club FC Groningen from 2005–07. He is the son of former Netherlands international footballer Wim Kieft.

Kieft gained three caps for the Netherlands under-16 side, in which he scored once.

Career
Born in Turin, Italy, while his father Wim Kieft played for Torino, Robbin Kieft played youth football for AFC and Ajax. He broke through to senior football as part of the Groningen team in the 2005–06 and 2006–07 seasons. As was the case with his father, he made his debut in a match against Sparta Rotterdam.

In July 2007 he trialled with ADO Den Haag but was unable to secure a contract. He then moved to amateur club AFC, where he had played youth football, but left "after a few months due to a disagreement".

In 2011, Kieft joined FC Hilversum from SC Buitenveldert.

References

Living people
1987 births
Footballers from Turin
Association football forwards
Dutch footballers
FC Groningen players
Amsterdamsche FC players
Eredivisie players
FC Hilversum players
AFC Ajax players
Netherlands youth international footballers
SC Buitenveldert players